Peter Gray FRS (25 August 1926 – 7 June 2012) was Professor of Physical Chemistry at the University of Leeds and subsequently Master of Gonville and Caius College, Cambridge.

Early life and education
Gray attended Newport High School. Gray was educated at the University of Cambridge where he was awarded a Bachelor of Arts in Natural Sciences in 1946 and a PhD in Chemistry three years later.

Career
In 1955 Gray was appointed a Lecturer in Chemistry at the University of Leeds.  He was promoted to Reader in 1959 and to a personal chair as Professor of Physical Chemistry in 1962.  He became Head of the Department of Physical Chemistry on the resignation of Professor Lord Dainton in 1965.  His research interests included combustion flame and explosion oscillatory reactions and chaos in chemistry.

Gray left Leeds when he was elected Master of his old college Gonville and Caius College, Cambridge in 1988. He remained Master until 1996 and was then a Life Fellow of the college until his death in 2012.

Awards and honours
Professor Gray's career was garlanded with many academic honours, including election as a Fellow of the Royal Society (FRS) in 1977.  Gray was awarded an Honorary DSc by the University of Leeds in 1997. His nomination reads:

Personal life
With his first wife, Barbara (who was a Lecturer in Biochemistry at the University of Leeds), Gray had four children; Christine, Andrew, David and Sally.  Following her death in 1992 Gray married his second wife, Rachel, who survived him. His interests included music, hill walking and classical Russian science and maths.

References

1926 births
2012 deaths
People from Newport, Wales
People educated at Newport High School
Alumni of Gonville and Caius College, Cambridge
British physical chemists
Fellows of Gonville and Caius College, Cambridge
Masters of Gonville and Caius College, Cambridge
Academics of the University of Leeds
Fellows of the Royal Society